Mobiles were an English new wave and synth-pop band, formed in 1981 in Eastbourne, East Sussex. They enjoyed a short period of chart success during the peak of the new wave and synth-pop movement in the early 1980s, most notably when their 1981 song "Drowning in Berlin" reached the top 10 of the UK Singles Chart in early 1982.

Career
Mobiles were based in Eastbourne, with band members hailing from Hastings, Bexhill-on-Sea and Eastbourne, and were led by vocalist Anna Maria. Other members included Russ Madge (lead guitars), David Blundell (bass), Chris Downton (guitars) and brothers John Smithson (keyboards / synthesizers) and Eddie Smithson (drums). Shortly after their formation they were signed by the Rialto Records label, owned by Nick Heath and Tim Heath, sons of British bandleader Ted Heath.

Their best-known release was their debut single, the minimalist electronic / synth-pop-inspired New Wave song "Drowning In Berlin". Initially issued around Christmas 1981, with lyrics concerning then then-ongoing Cold War and also the Berlin Wall, the single - which also featured a sample from the popular 1950 Irving Aaronson song "The Loveliest Night of the Year", itself adapted from the 1888 waltz "Sobre las olas" by Juventino Rosas - enjoyed heavy radio airplay and spent two months in the UK top 40, peaking at No. 9 in early February 1982.

Following the success of "Drowning in Berlin" , Mobiles were never able to reach the top 40 again, although the follow-up single, "Amour, Amour", featuring similar European themes to its predecessor, narrowly missed out on giving them a second top 40 placing, reaching No. 45 in early April 1982; however, despite critical acclaim, their eponymously-titled debut album, Mobiles, did not chart.

With all of their subsequent singles (including a cover version of the Foundations' 1969 hit "Build Me Up Buttercup" in early 1983) similarly also failing to chart, they were soon dropped by Rialto; consequently, a proposed second album was discontinued, and the group subsequently disbanded in 1984.

Following the band's dissolution, Anna Maria and Russ Madge continued to worked together in another short-lived band called the Avengers in the mid-1980s, releasing several singles for RCA Records. John and Eddie Smithson later worked with Jason Bonham, son of former Led Zeppelin drummer the late John Bonham, in the 1990s.

In 2006, a "best of" compilation album entitled Drowning in Berlin - The Best of Mobiles was issued on the Cherry Red Records label, featuring all seven singles and all album tracks featured in their eponymous debut album from 1982, as well as several B-sides, remixes and extended versions as bonus tracks.

Band members
 David Blundell – electric bass guitar
 Chris Downton – electric guitar
 Russ Madge – electric guitar
 Anna Maria – lead vocals
 Eddie Smithson – drum kit
 John Smithson – electronic keyboards

Additional personnel
 Paul Lynton – producer
 Tony Norman – manager

Discography

Albums
Mobiles (1982)
Drowning in Berlin: The Best Of – (2006, Cherry Red label – CDM RED 309)

Singles

References

External links

Mobiles' manager's website
Mobiles performing "Drowning in Berlin" on TopPop

English new wave musical groups
English pop music groups
British synth-pop new wave groups
Female-fronted musical groups
1981 establishments in the United Kingdom
1984 disestablishments in the United Kingdom